Kate Walter (born 7 May 1950 in Nottinghamshire, England) was a popular British writer of 50 romance novels in Mills & Boon since 1984.

Biography
Catherine Mary Wade was born on 7 May 1950 in Nottinghamshire, England of Irish extraction, but the family moved to West Yorkshire when she was just 18 months old. She was the middle child of five daughters.

She studied English and Library Science in the University College of Wales, Aberystwyth, where she met her husband. They married and installed in Lincolnshire She worked until she was a mother.

As Kate Walker published her first novel in 1984.

Bibliography

Single novels

The Sicilian Brothers Series
The Sicilian's Wife (2002)
The Sicilian's Red-Hot Revenge (2007)

Nicolaides / Morgan Series
The Married Mistress (2003)
Their Secret Baby (2003)

Alcolar Family Trilogy
The Twelve-month Mistress (2004)
The Spaniard's Inconvenient Wife (2004)
Bound by Blackmail (2005)

Wedlocked! Series Multi-Author
The Hired Husband (1999)

Omnibus In Collaboration
Society Weddings (2002) (with Sharon Kendrick)
Her Greek Tycoon (2003) (with Jacqueline Baird and Lynne Graham)
The Midnight Hour (2004) (with Lilian Darcy and Kate Hoffmann)
A Convenient Proposal (2004) (with Helen Bianchin and Lucy Gordon)
His Secret Baby (2004) (with Robyn Donald and Miranda Lee)
Virgin Brides (2005) (with Sharon Kendrick and Miranda Lee)
In the Sheikh's Bed (2005) (with Sharon Kendrick and Michelle Reid)
Christmas, Kids and Kisses (2006) (with Diana Hamilton and Renee Roszel)
Bound by a Baby (2007) (with Catherine Spencer and Rebecca Winters)

Non-fiction
A Straightforward Guide to Writing Romantic Fiction (2002)
12 Point Guide to Writing Romance (2004)

References and resources
Kate Walker's Official Website
Kate Walker's Webpage in Harlequin Enterprises Ltd's Website
Kate Walker's Webpage in Fantastic Fiction's Website

1950 births
Living people
Alumni of Aberystwyth University
English romantic fiction writers
People from Nottinghamshire
English women novelists
Women romantic fiction writers
Writers from Yorkshire